The Shawnee Tribe is a federally recognized Native American tribe in Oklahoma. Formerly known as the Loyal Shawnee, they are one of three federally recognized Shawnee tribes. The others are the Absentee-Shawnee Tribe of Indians of Oklahoma and the Eastern Shawnee Tribe of Oklahoma.

Government
The headquarters of the Shawnee Tribe is Miami, Oklahoma. Currently, there are about 10,000 enrolled tribal members, with 1,070 of them living within the state of Oklahoma.

Ben Barnes is the current elected Chief. Previously, Ron Sparkman was the elected chairman, serving a four-year term.

Economic development
The Shawnee Tribe issues its own tribal vehicle tags. They operate their own housing authority as well as a tribal smoke shop, the Shawnee Trails Gift Shop and Gallery, Shawnee Development LLC, and Shawnee Heritage Government Solutions. Their annual economic impact is estimated by the Oklahoma Indian Affairs Commissions to be $3 million. Shawnee Development LLC is an economic development corporation established in 2001, owned by the tribe but conducting business separately from the general government functions. The Shawnee Journal is a newspaper published by the tribe and distributed at no cost to all tribal members.

Culture
Some traditional ceremonies, such as the Spring and Fall Bread Dance, the Green Corn ceremony, and stomp dances are still held. These take place in White Oak, Oklahoma. Some Shawnees are also members of the Native American Church peyote ceremonies, with most attending in the winter outside of the traditional Shawnee ceremonial cycle.

History

The Shawnee Tribe is an Eastern Woodland tribe. They originally came from Ohio and Pennsylvania, and were the last of the Shawnee to leave their traditional homelands there. In the late 18th century, European American encroachment crowded Shawnee lands in the East, and one band migrated to Missouri — eventually becoming the Absentee Shawnee. Three reservations were granted to the Shawnee in Ohio by the 1817 Treaty of Fort Meigs: Wapakoneta, Lewistown, and Hog Creek. After the Indian Removal Act of 1830 passed, another Shawnee band, which would become the Eastern Shawnee Tribe relocated to Indian Territory in July 1831. The final band, who would become the Shawnee Tribe, relocated to Kansas in August 1831. Their Kansas lands were drastically reduced in 1854 and broken up into individual allotments in 1858.

During the Civil War many of the Shawnee Tribe fought for the Union, which inspired the name, "Loyal Shawnee." Instead of receiving compensation or honors for their service, they returned to their Kansas lands, only to find much of it taken over by non-Indian homesteaders.

In 1861 Kansas became a state, and the White people of Kansas demanded that all Indian tribes must be removed from the state. The Loyal Shawnee made an agreement with the Cherokee Nation in 1869, allowing 722 to gain citizenship within the Cherokee tribe and receive allotments of Cherokee land. They predominantly settled in what is now Craig and Rogers County, Oklahoma. They became known as the "Cherokee Shawnee," primarily settling in the areas of Bird Creek (now known as Sperry); Hudson Creek (now known as Fairland); and White Oak. The Shawnee Reservation in Kansas was never legally dissolved and some Shawnee families still hold their allotment lands in Kansas.

Beginning in the 1980s, the Shawnee Tribe began an effort to regain their own tribal status, independent of the Cherokee Nation. Congress passed Public Law 106-568, the Shawnee Tribe Status Act of 2000, and the Shawnee Tribe was able to organize as their own autonomous, federally recognized tribe. James R. Squirrel was the initial Chairman and was recognized by the AARP in 2009, as being instrumental in the Shawnee Tribe being federally recognized.

Notable Loyal Shawnee
 Heidi BigKnife, jeweler, silversmith
 Ruthe Blalock Jones, painter, printmaker, and arts educator
 Yvonne Chouteau, prima ballerina.
 Timmy Lee Jr, Texas Blues Rock guitarist.

See also
Black Bob

References

External links
 Shawnee Tribe, official website
 Constitution of the Shawnee Tribe

 
Native American tribes in Oklahoma
Federally recognized tribes in the United States